Seamus Donovan McClelland (14 January 1949, Toome, County Antrim, Northern Ireland – 23 February 2018) was an Irish Social Democratic and Labour Party (SDLP) politician who was a Member of the Northern Ireland Assembly (MLA) for  South Antrim from 1998 to 2003.

He was appointed Deputy Speaker in February 2000. He was Chairman of the Standards and Privileges Committee and a member of the Public Accounts Committee.

Educated at Ballymena Academy, he went on to Trinity College, Dublin and Queen's University Belfast where he graduated with a Bachelor of Science Degree in Economics. In 1973 Donovan joined the staff of Queen's University Belfast and began his career as a Researcher/Lecturer. He joined the Department of Agriculture in 1975 and, in 1978, took up a post as lecturer in Economics at the University of Ulster.

Donovan entered politics in 1989 when he was elected to Antrim Borough Council. He was elected as Deputy Mayor of the Borough in 1999. He was an SDLP delegate to the Brooke/Mayhew talks in 1992 and a delegate to the Forum for Peace and Reconciliation, established by the Irish Government at Dublin Castle in 1994.

Donovan was elected to the new Northern Ireland Forum in 1996 and was a member of the SDLP delegation to the Multi-party Talks chaired by Senator George Mitchell. He stood as a parliamentary candidate for the South Antrim constituency in the Westminster elections on three occasions.

Personal life
McClelland was married to Noreen, a local councillor and 2005 UK General Election candidate for the SDLP. The couple raised three children.

References

1949 births
2018 deaths
Academics of Queen's University Belfast
Academics of Ulster University
Alumni of Queen's University Belfast
Alumni of Trinity College Dublin
Members of Antrim Borough Council
Members of the Northern Ireland Forum
Northern Ireland MLAs 1998–2003
People educated at Ballymena Academy
Politicians from County Antrim
Protestant Irish nationalists
Social Democratic and Labour Party councillors
Social Democratic and Labour Party MLAs